Anne or Annie Murphy may refer to:

Anne Murphy in Hindawi affair
Anne Murphy (mayor); see List of mayors of Stonnington
Annie Murphy (comics); see List of Xeric grant winners
Annie Murphy, Canadian actress

See also
Anne-Marie Murphy (disambiguation)